Gareth Waite (born 16 February 1986) is an English footballer who played in the Football League for Darlington. He joined that club from Northern Football League Division One side Spennymoor Town. He is a midfielder.

Career
Waite, Spennymoor Town's 2008–09 player of the year, joined Football League Two club Darlington on 15 January 2010. Darlington manager Steve Staunton expressed his gratitude to Spennymoor Town's chairman Bradley Groves and manager Jason Ainsley for allowing Waite the opportunity to play League football. Waite made his debut against Rotherham United in a 2–1 away win, and his first goal came three games later, at home to Rotherham United. Waite was employed by Staunton as a right winger, although his natural position is in the centre. Waite was released by Darlington in June 2011. He then returned to Spennymoor Town, and later played for Stockton Sunday League club Thornaby Jolly Farmers.

References

External links

1986 births
Living people
People from Thornaby-on-Tees
Footballers from County Durham
Footballers from Yorkshire
English footballers
Association football midfielders
Spennymoor Town F.C. players
Darlington F.C. players
English Football League players
National League (English football) players